Richard B. McQuade Jr. (born April 7, 1940) is an American attorney and jurist who served as a former United States district judge of the United States District Court for the Northern District of Ohio.

Early life and education

Born on April 7, 1940, in Toledo, Ohio, McQuade received a Bachelor of Arts degree from the University of Toledo in 1961 and a Juris Doctor from the University of Toledo College of Law in 1965.

Career 
He was an assistant prosecutor in Fulton County, Ohio from 1966 to 1968. He was the prosecuting attorney of Fulton County from 1969 to 1978. He was in private practice in Swanton, Ohio from 1966 to 1978. He was a judge of the Ohio Court of Common Pleas from 1978 to 1986.

On July 28, 1986, McQuade was nominated by President Ronald Reagan to a seat on the United States District Court for the Northern District of Ohio vacated by Judge Nicholas Joseph Walinski Jr. McQuade was confirmed by the United States Senate on September 12, 1986, and received his commission on September 15, 1986. McQuade served until his resignation, on September 30, 1989.

Following his resignation from the federal bench, McQuade became president and CEO of Blue Cross/Blue Shield of Ohio. He is also a trustee of the University of Toledo.

References

External links

1940 births
Living people
Ohio state court judges
Judges of the United States District Court for the Northern District of Ohio
United States district court judges appointed by Ronald Reagan
20th-century American judges
University of Toledo alumni
University of Toledo College of Law alumni
People from Toledo, Ohio
People from Swanton, Ohio